Rutsel Silvestre Jacinto Martha, a Dutch national, is the former general counsel and director of legal affairs of the International Fund for Agricultural Development and INTERPOL.

Education 

Martha graduated from Leiden University with a Bachelor of Laws where he concentrated on public international law and international organisations. He then received a Master of Law in international legal studies at the American University Washington College of Law, where he concentrated on international banking and finance, and a Doctor of Laws (PhD) at Leiden University with a thesis concerning public international law and taxation.

Professional career 

Martha is a distinguished international legal practitioner based in London who was formerly the general counsel and director of legal affairs of the International Fund for Agricultural Development (Rome, Italy) (2008–2013) and INTERPOL (Lyon, France) (2004–2008). He was the minister of justice of the Netherlands Antilles (1998–2002) and minister plenipotentiary in the Netherlands Permanent Representation to the European Union (1990–1998). He also worked as counsellor in the Legal Department of the International Monetary Fund (Washington, D.C.) and, prior to this, as legal advisor to the Central Bank of the Netherlands Antilles (Curaçao, NA).

Academic experience 

Martha has been a Partner Fellow on the Lauterpacht Linked programme at the Lauterpacht Centre for International Law, University of Cambridge since 2017. From 2007 to 2013, he was an adjunct professor of law at New York University, in which capacity he was a visiting professor of law at the National University of Singapore. He was also an adjunct professor of law at the American University Washington College of Law from 1988 to 1989. From 1983 to 1986, he was a lecturer in law at the University of the Netherlands Antilles.

Expertise 

His areas of expertise include public international law, international law enforcement cooperation, international monetary and economic law, international taxation, and European Union law. His current practice concentrates on INTERPOL matters, treaty-based dispute settlement, matters affecting politically exposed persons, sanctions, extradition, mutual legal assistance, and asset freezing.  In the past, he was involved in the distribution of the assets and liabilities of the Central Bank of the Netherlands upon the departure of Aruba from the Netherlands Antilles, and he was the Secretary to the Gold Fund of the Netherlands Antilles and Aruba. He also represented the Netherlands Antilles in GATT litigation and before the Court of Justice of the European Union.

Honours 

Martha was awarded the 1989 Mitchell B. Carroll Prize of the International Fiscal Association. In 2004, he was appointed Officer in the Royal Order of Orange of the Netherlands.

Publications 

He has published extensively on international law, both in Dutch and in English, including four books:

 The Financial Obligation in International Law (Oxford University Press, 2015) (cited with approval by the English High Court of Justice in Law Debenture Trust Corporation PLC v Ukraine [2017] EWHC 655 (Comm))
 The Legal Foundations of INTERPOL (Hart Publishing, 2010) 
 Tax Treatment of International Civil Servants (Martinus Nijhoff Publishers, 2009)
 The Jurisdiction to Tax in International Law (Kluwer, 1989)

References

1955 births
Living people
Curaçao lawyers
Dutch legal scholars
Curaçao writers
Government ministers of the Netherlands Antilles